Khrystyna Dmytrenko (born 31 May 1999) is a Ukrainian biathlete. Her elder sister Valeria is also a biathlete. Her hobbies are singing and reading books.

Career
She represented Ukraine at the 2016 Winter Youth Olympics in Lillehammer and became the first ever Ukrainian youth Olympic champion both in biathlon and winter sports.

Performances

References

External links
 Biathlon.com.ua

1999 births
Living people
Sportspeople from Chernihiv
Ukrainian female biathletes
Biathletes at the 2016 Winter Youth Olympics
Youth Olympic gold medalists for Ukraine
21st-century Ukrainian women